The Adaptation Fund is an international fund that finances projects and programs aimed at helping developing countries to adapt to the harmful effects of climate change. It is set up under the Kyoto Protocol of the United Nations Framework Convention on Climate Change (UNFCCC).

History

The Adaptation Fund was officially launched in 2007, although it was established in 2001 at the 7th Conference of the Parties (COP7) to the UNFCCC in Marrakech, Morocco to finance concrete adaptation projects and programmes that reduce the adverse effects of climate change facing communities, countries, and sectors. It is intended to finance climate adaptation projects and programmes in developing countries that are parties to the Kyoto Protocol.

Funding mechanism

The Adaptation Fund was initiated to be primarily financed by a share of proceeds from clean development mechanism (CDM) project activities and also with funds from other sources. However, the initial modest contribution of 131€ was made by students from Marienschule in Euskirchen, Germany, after a presentation about the climate crisis made to them by Stuart Scott, who had been attending an intercessional meeting of the negotiations. The ongoing share of CDM proceeds amounts to 2% of certified emission reductions (CER) issued for a CDM project activity. As of Sept. 30, 2013, the Fund had accrued US$188.6 million in proceeds from CER sales. As of November 30, 2013, the Fund had US$156 million available to allocate to climate adaptation projects. By early November 2013, the Adaptation Fund Board (AFB) had allocated approximately US$200 million to support climate adaptation in 29 countries. By October 2015, the Adaptation Fund had committed US$331 million in 54 countries. Total contributions in 2022 amount 1.237,8 million USD with Germany being the largest contributor (513,51 Million USD).

As the market for carbon credits plunged, other funding sources became more critical for the Adaptation Fund, and include donations from Annex 1 countries. These amounted to US$151 million as of Sept. 30, 2013. In a major fundraising push, the AFB and secretariat surpassed its goal for pledged donations by the end of 2013, with over US$100 million pledged and donated by governments.

The Adaptation Fund is managed by the Adaptation Fund Board (AFB). The secretariat of the Adaptation Fund Board provides research, advisory, administrative, and an array of other services to the Board, and consists of an international staff based in Washington, DC. The World Bank serves as the trustee of the Adaptation Fund. The AFB is composed of 16 members and 16 alternates representing Annex I countries, Non-Annex I countries, Least Developed Countries (LDCs), Small Island Developing States (SIDSs), and regional constituencies. The AFB meets three times per year in Bonn, Germany. The German Parliament has conferred legal capacity to the AFB.

One unique feature of the Adaptation Fund is its direct access mechanism, which enables accredited national implementing entities (NIEs) and regional implementing agencies (RIEs) in developing countries to directly access climate adaptation financing.

References

External links 
 Adaptation Fund official website
 Kyoto Protocol under the UNFCCC
 List of Adaptation Fund Board members

Adaptation